This list tackles current and past bans on the deployment of Overseas Filipino Workers (OFWs) or Filipino migrant workers to other countries.

Background
The Philippine government assesses which countries where Overseas Filipino Workers (OFWs) to by evaluating the general peace and order situation in the country as well as working conditions for migrant workers in a certain country.

Peace and order
The Department of Foreign Affairs of the Philippines issues four levels of crisis alert levels, a travel warning which also serves as a basis for labor deployment bans for Filipino migrant workers to certain countries.

Worker conditions
Aside from countries experiencing problems with peace and order, the Philippine government can also restrict deployment of Filipino workers to countries determined by the Philippine Department of Foreign Affairs to be non-compliant to the Republic Act 10022 also known as Amended Migrant Workers Act.

A country can be assessed as compliant with the said law if it:

Has existing labor and social laws protecting the rights of workers, including migrant workers;
Is a signatory to and/or a ratifier of multilateral conventions, declarations or resolutions relating to the protection of workers, including migrant workers; and
Has concluded a bilateral agreement or arrangement with the government on the protection of the rights of overseas Filipino workers;

International companies and contractors with operations in non-compliant companies can still deploy Filipinos to countries with no existing ban.

Current bans

Nationwide

Ban on select areas

Previous bans

References

Deployment bans
Emigration
Labor in the Philippines